Kolibri is a shooting game created exclusively for the Sega 32X, a Sega Mega Drive/Genesis add-on console. It was designed by Ed Annunziata and developed by Novotrade (now known as Appaloosa). Kolibri is the word or root word for hummingbird in several European languages.

Gameplay 

The game offers numerous power-ups for the player's kolibri. Each one follows different patterns. Some are spread shots and others will home in on an enemy. This game also features a good number of puzzles which grow increasingly difficult with each level.

Plot 

Long ago, a crystal from outer space embedded itself in the earth and started creating life. Soon another similar crystal crashed to earth and started to destroy what the first crystal had created and started to sap away its strength. Before being totally destroyed the crystal gave a lone hummingbird its power. It is up to this hummingbird to save the earth.

Development and release

Reception 

Kolibri received mostly middling reviews. Electronic Gaming Monthly praised the game's impressive visuals and originality, but highly criticized how the game restarts the player character in a highly vulnerable position each time it dies. Scary Larry of GamePro concurred that the visuals are impressive, but was not convinced of the game's originality, remarking that "Although the concept is unique, the gameplay and FunFactor are standard." He also commented that the power-ups look weak, needing to manually turn the bird around to shoot enemies behind him is cumbersome and frustrating, and the bird often gets lost in the backgrounds. He concluded, "Kolibri isn't awful, just average. You'd expect more from the 32X—something more along the lines of Gradius or R-Type." A reviewer for Next Generation said the game doesn't have anything which couldn't have been done on the stock Genesis and suffers from "very monotonous" gameplay, though he saved most of his criticism for the "absurd" premise: "Trying to remember why you bought that 32X? Well, Sega is hoping you've been waiting for the ultimate hummingbird simulation game. That's right, in Kolibri you are a hummingbird (not even a wisecracking, zany hummingbird with an attitude, just a hummingbird) and you fly around toasting insects with the guided missile on your beak." Sega Saturn Magazine commented, "Large and complex, Kolibri offers value for money, but a certain dullness and insipidity accompanies it." Italian magazine Mega Console criticized the controls and music, but praised the graphics and parallax, yet giving the game a near-perfect score of 99. In 2001, webcomic Penny Arcade lampooned the game in their 25th anniversary "We're Right Awards," calling it the "Best Hummingbird-based Shooter Available For The 32X."

References

External links 
Kolibri on GameFAQs
Kolibri on MobyGames

1995 video games
Appaloosa Interactive games
Horizontally scrolling shooters
Sega 32X games
Sega 32X-only games
Video games developed in Hungary
Video games about birds
Multiplayer and single-player video games
Sega video games